Silesian Fantasy Club (or Silesian Science-Fiction Club) is the oldest science fiction and fantasy fandom club in Silesia, Poland. Founded in 1981 in Katowice, it has been the organizer of Polcon, largest of Polish science-fiction conventions, five times (1986, 1988, 1997, 2001 and 2010), the 2010 also being Eurocon, and yearly organizes the Seminarium Literackie con, as well as anime&manga Asucon. It also has its own award, the Śląkfa (awarded since 1984). It has over 200 members, several publications, and a library. Notable members include Piotr W. Cholewa, translator of English literature, and Jakub Ćwiek and Anna Kańtoch, writers. It is a Public Benefit Organization as defined by Polish law.

See also
Science fiction and fantasy in Poland

External links
 Homepage
 Polish NGO entry

Science fiction organizations
Polish science fiction
Polish fantasy
Organizations established in 1981
1981 establishments in Poland